The Linacre Methodist Mission is a building on Linacre Road, in Litherland, Metropolitan Borough of Sefton, Merseyside, United Kingdom. Built in 1904, it is a grade II listed building.

References

Grade II listed churches in Merseyside
Methodist churches in Merseyside
Churches completed in 1904

External links
 Linacre Methodist Mission website